The International Medical University (IMU) is a private, English language, health sciences university in Kuala Lumpur, Malaysia. It was established in 1992, and is active in research and teaching within medicine and healthcare with a strong international orientation. IMU is a wholly owned subsidiary of Asia's largest private healthcare group IHH Healthcare, which is majority-owned by the Mitsui & Co. The current CEO of IMU is Abdul Aziz Baba.

IMU was the first private higher education institution in Malaysia that received the right to confer academic degrees, and it was granted full university status by the government in 1999. It cooperates with universities in the United Kingdom, Australia, New Zealand, Canada, Ireland and China.

The main campus of IMU is located in Bukit Jalil, Kuala Lumpur. As of November 2018, the university has 716 employees and 3,786 students.

The university offers programmes in medical and other health sciences as well as MSc and PhD programmes.

IMU was one of only three private universities in Malaysia which was awarded the "6 Star: Outstanding" SETARA ranking by the Ministry of Higher Education in December 2020.

Ownership
IMU is a wholly owned subsidiary of IHH Healthcare, Asia's largest private healthcare group. The majority shareholder of IHH Healthcare is Mitsui & Co., followed by Khazanah Nasional (the sovereign wealth fund of the Government of Malaysia) and Citigroup as minority shareholders.

Principal officers and management

The ceremonial head of the university is the Chancellor. Mohamed Zahir Ismail served as the first Chancellor (1999–2004), followed by Sulaiman Daud (2005–2010), T. Devaraj (2010–2013), Amir Abbas (2013–2018), Gan Ee Kiang (2018-2021) and Yahya Awang (since 2021). Currently Aini Ideris is the Pro-Chancellor.

The university's effective head and chief executive officer is the Vice-Chancellor, known as president before 2016. The first Vice-Chancellor was Kamal Salih (1993–2001), followed by Abu Bakar Suleiman (2001–2015) and Abdul Aziz Baba (since 2016).

The Deputy Vice-Chancellor is Peter Pook Chuen Keat. Victor Lim is Pro Vice-Chancellor for Institutional Advancement, Vishna Devi A/P Nadarajah, Pro Vice-Chancellor, Education,  Prof Datuk Lokman Hakim Sulaiman is Pro Vice-Chancellor for Research and Toh Chooi Gait is Pro Vice-Chancellor for Strategic Development and International.

IMU's former Vice-Chancellor Abu Bakar Suleiman is Chairman of IMU Group and co-founder, Dr Mei Ling Young is advisor to the Group.

Notable academics

For a full list of IMU academics with Wikipedia biographies, see 

 Abdul Aziz Baba, Professor and Vice-Chancellor
 Abu Bakar Suleiman, President
Kew Siang Tong, Professor
 Ong Kok Hai, Professor
 Victor Lim, Professor and Pro Vice-Chancellor

Academic ranks
The International Medical University uses the following main academic ranks
Professor
Associate Professor
Senior Lecturer
Lecturer

Programmes

Pre-university
Pre-university programme at the International Medical University was launched in January 2014 with its first cohort graduating in December 2014. The course equips students with core knowledge and skills required for the undergraduate programmes. 
 Foundation in Science

Undergraduate/graduate
The International Medical University offers a wide range of undergraduate programmes in core and complementary healthcare disciplines.
 Medicine
 Dentistry
 Pharmacy
 Pharmaceutical Chemistry
 Nursing
 Nursing Science
 Biomedical Science
 Medical Biotechnology
 Dietetics with Nutrition
 Nutrition
 Psychology
 Chinese Medicine
 Chiropractic

Postgraduate
Postgraduate programmes at the International Medical University are research-based as well as coursework-based (with dissertation), encompassing disciplines such as clinical research, biomedical science and public health.
 MSc in Analytical & Pharmaceutical Chemistry
 MSc in Molecular Medicine
 Master of Pharmacy Practice
 MSc in Public Health
MSc in Acupuncture
MBA in Healthcare Management
Postgraduate Certificate in Healthcare Management
Postgraduate Diploma in Healthcare Management
Postgraduate Diploma in Implant Dentistry
Postgraduate Diploma in Diabetes Management and Education
 Master in Health Professions Education
 MSc & PhD in Medical Sciences (Research)

Partner universities
IMU has co-operation programmes with more than 30 partner medical schools (as of 2015) around the world, mainly in the United Kingdom and Australia, but also in New Zealand, Ireland, Canada and China. Its partner universities include the University of Edinburgh, Queen Mary University of London, the University of Manchester, the Australian National University, and the University of New South Wales.

Alumni

 Alumni Association Committee (AAC)
IMU Alumni Association Committee was established in 2002 where the elected committee members would serve for two years. The Association aims to be a place to support IMU alumni and for the alumni to socialize and network with one another. It was not that active though.

 Alumni Relations Office (ARO)
IMU Alumni Relations Office (ARO) was established in early 2016 with the aim to develop an international network of IMU graduates and to engage alumni through the exchange of knowledge, academic ideas and professional development. The Alumni Relations Office (ARO) serves as the point of contact for IMU alumni. The office is located at the Student Services Hub, IMU Bukit Jalil Campus.

References

External links
 International Medical University
 International Medical College
 IMU Healthcare
 الطبية الدولية في ماليزيا imu

 
Universities and colleges in Kuala Lumpur
Educational institutions established in 1992
Medical schools in Malaysia
Nursing schools in Malaysia
IHH Healthcare
1992 establishments in Malaysia
Private universities and colleges in Malaysia